Mitraphylline, an oxindole derivative, is an active alkaloid in the leaves of the tree Mitragyna speciosa, commonly known as kratom. As a non-narcotic constituent, it also occurs to a significant amount in the bark of Uncaria tomentosa (Cat's Claw) along with a number of isomeric alkaloids.

Current research is focusing on antiproliferative and cytotoxic effects and its in vivo efficacy to induce apoptosis in human breast cancer, sarcoma as well as lymphoblastic leukaemia cell lines.

References 

Indole alkaloids
Spiro compounds